Brickellia venosa, the veiny brickellbush, is a North American species of flowering plants in the family Asteraceae. It is native to northern Mexico (Chihuahua, Sonora) and the southwestern United States (New Mexico, Arizona, far western Texas (El Paso County).

Brickellia venosa is a branching shrub up to 80 cm (32 inches) tall, growing from a woody caudex. It produces many small flower heads with yellow disc florets but no ray florets.

References

venosa
Flora of the Southwestern United States
Flora of Mexico
Plants described in 1913